Pidilizumab (formerly CT-011) is a monoclonal antibody being developed by Medivation for the treatment of cancer and infectious diseases. Pidilizumab was originally thought to bind to the PD-1 immune checkpoint molecule, however, recent evidence suggests that Delta-like 1 (DLL1) is its primary binding target while binding to PD-1 is secondary and restricted to non-glycosylated and hypoglycosylated forms of this molecule. Pidilizumab causes in the attenuation of apoptotic processes in lymphocytes, primarily effector/memory T cells.

Clinical trials
It had encouraging results by 2011 from phase II clinical trials for diffuse large B-cell lymphoma.  A phase II open-label study in combination for relapsed follicular lymphoma found good results compared to usual response rates.  A phase I/II open label study in pediatric patients with a rare form of brain cancer, diffuse intrinsic pontine glioma, found improvement in overall survival compared to expected outcome. An add-on trial for multiple myeloma is ongoing.

References 

Monoclonal antibodies
Experimental drugs